Mistaken Identity, also sometimes billed as Mistaken Person, is a Canadian thriller film, directed by Gilles Noël and released in 1996.

The film stars Michel Côté as Charles Renard, a police officer returning to work for the first time since being left hearing impaired by a bullet wound to the head. He is assigned to investigate Maria (Macha Grenon), an actress who is robbing men to finance a stage production of August Strindberg's Miss Julie. The film's cast also includes Paul Doucet, Marie-Andrée Corneille, Robert Gravel, Paul Savoie and Luc Picard.

At the 17th Genie Awards, Corneille was nominated for Best Supporting Actress.

References

External links

1996 films
Canadian crime thriller films
Quebec films
French-language Canadian films
1990s Canadian films